In operating systems, write barrier is a mechanism for enforcing a particular ordering in a sequence of writes to a storage system in a computer system.  For example, a write barrier in a file system is a mechanism (program logic) that ensures that in-memory file system state is written out to persistent storage in the correct order.

In Garbage collection 
A write barrier in a garbage collector is a fragment of code emitted by the compiler immediately before every store operation to ensure that (e.g.) generational invariants are maintained.

In Computer storage 
A write barrier in a memory system, also known as a memory barrier, is a hardware-specific compiler intrinsic that ensures that all preceding memory operations "happen before" all subsequent ones.

See also 
 Native Command Queuing

References

External links 
 Barriers and journaling filesystems (LWN.net, May 21, 2008)

Compilers
Memory management